The  were the railway lines specified by Japanese National Railways (JNR) under the 1980  to be closed. All of 83 lines were closed and substituted by buses or transferred to other railway operators between 1983 and 1990.

Selection
Article 8 of the JNR Reconstruction Act (officially the Act on Special Measures concerning Reconstruction Promotion of Management of Japanese National Railways, Act No. 111 of 1980) directed JNR to specify unprofitable lines ("specified local lines") that should be replaced by bus operations based on certain criteria set by a Cabinet Order.

JNR selected 83 lines in three phases.

List of lines
Operators in parentheses succeeded the railway operation of the lines. Lines not followed by parentheses were substituted by buses.

First phase 
Shiranuka Line
Kuji Line (Sanriku Railway)
Miyako Line (Sanriku Railway)
Sakari Line (Sanriku Railway)
Nitchū Line
Akatani Line
Uonuma Line
Shimizukō Line
Kamioka Line (Kamioka Railway)
Tarumi Line (Tarumi Railway)
Kuroishi Line (Kōnan Railway)
Takasago Line
Miyanoharu Line
Tsuma Line
Komatsushima Line
Aioi Line
Shokotsu Line
Manji Line
Hōjō Line (Hōjō Railway)
Miki Railway Miki Line (Miki Railway)
Kurayoshi Line
Katsuki Line
Katsuta Line
Soeda Line
Muroki Line
Yabe Line
Iwanai Line
Kōhin North Line
Ōhata Line (Shimokita Kōtsū)
Kōhin South Line
Bikō Line
Yashima Line (Yuri Kōgen Railway)
Akechi Line (Akechi Railway)
Amagi Line (Amagi Railway)
Takamori Line (Minamiaso Railway)
Kakunodate Line (Akita Nairiku Jūkan Railway)
Shigaraki Line (Shigaraki Kohgen Railway) 
Wakasa Line (Wakasa Railway)
Kihara Line (Isumi Railway)

Second phase 
Urushio Line
Iburi Line
Tomiuchi Line
Aniai Line (Akita Nairiku Jūkan Railway)
Etsumi South Line (Nagaragawa Railway)
Miyanojō Line
Hiroo Line
Ōsumi Line
Futamata Line (Tenryū Hamanako Railroad)
Setana Line
Yūmō Line
Shihoro Line
Ise Line (Ise Railway)
Saga Line
Shibushi Line
Haboro Line
Horonai Line
Matsumae Line
Utashinai Line
Shibetsu Line
Tempoku Line
Nayoro Main Line
Chihoku Line (Hokkaidō Chihoku Kōgen Railway)
Aizu Line (Aizu Railway)
Mooka Line (Mooka Railway)
Ashio Line (Watarase Keikoku Railway)
Gannichi Line (Nishikigawa Railway)
Matsuura Line (Matsuura Railway)
Kamiyamada Line
Takachiho Line (Takachiho Railway)

Third phase 
Nagai Line (Yamagata Railway)
Okata Line (Aichi Loop Railway)
Noto Line (Noto Railway)
Miyazu Line (Kitakinki Tango Railway)
Kajiya Line
Taisha Line
Nakamura Line (Tosa Kuroshio Railway)
Ita Line (Heisei Chikuhō Railway)
Itoda Line (Heisei Chikuhō Railway)
Tagawa Line (Heisei Chikuhō Railway)
Yunomae Line (Kumagawa Railway)
Miyada Line

See also
Beeching cuts

References

Japanese National Railways